Bishopston is a suburb of the city of Bristol in south west England. Bishopston is around Gloucester Road (A38), the main northern arterial road in the city and Bishop Road.

Politics
Bishopston is in the Bristol West parliamentary constituency and is represented by Thangam Debbonaire of the Labour Party. It is split between the wards of Redland and Bishopston and Ashley Down. Redland ward is represented by Martin Fodor and Fi Hance, both of the Green Party and Bishopston and Ashley Down ward is represented by Lily Fitzgibbon and Emma Edwards, also both of the Green Party

Bishopston 
Bishopston is named after the bishop of the local diocese who controversially sold off the church's land to private developers in the early 19th century.  The sale was even raised as an issue in the House of Commons.  The parish of Bishopston was then created in July 1862 with a population of 1300 and expanding to 9140 in the Census 1901.  In the Census 2001 Bishopston registered a resident population of 11,996.  The district is part of the Bristol built-up area, having been swallowed by the growing city, running directly into the surrounding districts of Redland, Ashley Down, Horfield and Henleaze.

The area has a relatively large student population, with 21% of the over-16 population in education compared to 8.4% in Bristol and 5.1% in England and Wales.

Some of the location filming for the cult BBC sitcom The Young Ones was done in Codrington Road and elsewhere. The external shots for the famous "bank-robbing" scene in the last episode were filmed outside the now closed Bristol North Swimming Baths on Gloucester Road.

Bishopston was the home of two Nobel Prize–winning physicists.  In 1933 Paul Dirac, who attended the Bishop Road Primary School, just a few hundred metres from where he lived on Monk Road, won the prize after his contributions to quantum mechanics.  In 1950 Cecil Frank Powell won the prestigious award for contributions to Physics (specifically, for his development of the photographic method of studying nuclear processes and his discoveries regarding mesons made with this method). Bishopston was home to television presenter Adam Hart-Davis and psychologist Susan Blackmore.

The area has produced musicians of note including Robert "3D" Del Naja and Daddy G of Massive Attack, DJ Collective Stanton Warriors and International DJ Nick Warren.

Juventus and Italian footballer Alessandro Del Piero also lived in the district for a period as a child when his father worked as a restaurateur in the thriving Italian community that lives there.

The famous film star Cary Grant (real name Archibald Alexander Leach) attended Bishop Road School in Bishopston. As a child he lived nearby in Hughenden Road next to Horfield Common, where there is a blue plaque to commemorate him.

Bishopston has two primary schools, St. Bonaventure's Catholic Primary School which served the huge Italian Irish and South American Catholic community and Bishop Road Primary School COE which was a secondary school up until the mid 1980s and served children of the Anglican faith and drew in children from the Asian and Jamaican community in St Paul's and Montpellier.

The main artery, Gloucester Road well known for its pubs and restaurants, and one of the last remaining local high streets in the country, is well used by local residents. In addition to the independently run shops such as Scoopaway, La Ruca, Gardener's Patch and Harvest, recent years has seen several supermarket chains opening stores in the area. This, and the range of fairly traded and local goods available, has made it popular with ecologically minded shoppers.

Bishopston is home to Gloucestershire County Cricket Club, located off Nevil Road. The ground's capacity has been increased to hold international cricket matches.

The David Thomas Memorial church, in neighbouring St Andrews, was erected between 1879 and 1881 but was demolished in 1987, destroying most of a Gothic fantasy by Stuart Coleman. The building still retains a thin octagonal spire and west front but the massive halls, apse and rib vaults have now gone, and have been replaced by flats by Stride Treglown.

Education
Bishopston is the location of Bishop Road Primary School, which opened in 1900, and is the largest primary school in Bristol, notable for having educated Cary Grant and Paul Dirac.

References

External links 

 Census data
 Photographs of Bishopston at the Geograph project
 Bristol Buddhist Centre meeting in Gloucester Road, Bishopston
 Bishopston Trading A fair trade workers cooperative.

Areas of Bristol